The Penn Alto Building is a landmark building located in downtown Altoona, Pennsylvania, United States. The building is nine stories high and has a partial tenth floor penthouse. The name of the building remains the same, even though its usage has changed over time. The name changed from the Penn Alto Hotel to Penn Alto Apartments when it changed from strictly being a hotel to a residential hotel, which rents both apartments and hotel rooms. The current name is City Hall Commons, deriving its name from its proximity to City Hall, which is just across the street.

The building was designed by the H.L. Stevens & Company and constructed in 1921 and was added to the National Register of Historic Places in 1989. It is in the Downtown Altoona Historic District. Official measurements of the building conflict with each other. These variations may be due to the slight incline that the Penn Alto was built on.

See also
Downtown Altoona, Pennsylvania
Altoona, Pennsylvania

References

External links

Residential buildings on the National Register of Historic Places in Pennsylvania
Buildings and structures in Altoona, Pennsylvania
Historic American Buildings Survey in Pennsylvania
Altoona, Pennsylvania
National Register of Historic Places in Blair County, Pennsylvania
Individually listed contributing properties to historic districts on the National Register in Pennsylvania